Trunk Archive (Located in New York City) is an image licensing agency. The company provides commercial imagery from artists like Annie Leibovitz, Arthur Elgort, Nick Knight, Inez & Vinoodh, Mary Ellen Mark, Nadine Ijewere, Miles Aldridge, and Pamela Hanson.

History 
The company was founded in Copenhagen, Denmark in 2004 by a group of investors, including serial entrepreneur Mickey Beyer-Clausen, who also served as the company's CEO until 2007. The current CEO is Matthew Moneypenny 

In 2013, the company was acquired by Waddell & Reed and Ivy Asset Strategy Funds.

In 2014 the company acquired Snapper Media in September 2013. 

In 2014 the company announced that it had acquired Bernstein & Andriulli (B&A) and Gallery Stock.

Controversy 
The company has received criticism for its use of automated image tracking software PicScout to identify copyright infringement of images in its catalogue. In 2015, they claimed infringement against the magazine 2600: The Hacker Quarterly for their use of a transparent ink splatter image on the cover of their Spring 2012 issue. 2600 then revealed that the original ink spatter was created by an artist on DeviantArt who had released it into the public domain, meaning that Trunk Archive did not hold the copyright for the image. The infringement case was subsequently dropped by the company, and COO Melissa Kelly sent a letter to the magazine apologizing for the mistake.

References 

Stock photography
Photo archives in the United States
Privately held companies based in New York (state)
Photography companies of the United States